The Satu Mare Metropolitan Area is a metropolitan area of Romania founded on April 26, 2013 around Satu Mare, the capital city of Satu Mare County. It has a population of 233,306 and, besides Satu Mare, it includes four cities and towns (Carei, Ardud, Livada, and Tășnad), as well as 26 communes.

As defined by Eurostat, the Satu Mare functional urban area has a population of 149,387 residents.

List of cities, towns and communes

References

Sources
 
 

Geography of Satu Mare County
Metropolitan areas of Romania